David Lees Caldwell (7 May 1932 – 2 August 2017) was a Scottish football player, who played for Aberdeen, Rotherham United and Greenock Morton. He won the Scottish Football League title in 1954–55 and the Scottish League Cup in 1955–56 with Aberdeen.

References

External links 

1932 births
2017 deaths
Sportspeople from Clydebank
Footballers from West Dunbartonshire
Association football fullbacks
Scottish footballers
Aberdeen F.C. players
Rotherham United F.C. players
Greenock Morton F.C. players
Scottish Football League players
Highland Football League players
Scottish Junior Football Association players
Eastern Canada Professional Soccer League players
Toronto City players
Fraserburgh F.C. players
English Football League players
Duntocher Hibernian F.C. players
Scottish expatriate footballers
Scottish expatriate sportspeople in Canada
Expatriate soccer players in Canada